The human Y-chromosome haplogroup E-V12 is a subclade of E-M78, which in turn is part of the larger haplogroup E1b1b1. It is found across Northern Africa with a strong presence in Egypt, Sudan, the Central Sahel, the Horn of Africa, and in lower frequency across the Levant, Anatolia, African Great Lakes region, and Europe.

Undifferentiated E-V12* lineages
Undifferentiated E-V12* lineages (not E-V32 or E-M224, so therefore named "E-V12*") peak in frequency among Southern Egyptians (up to 74.5%). The subclades are also scattered widely in small amounts in both Northern Africa and Europe, but with very little sign in Western Asia, apart from Turkey. These E-V12* lineages were formerly included (along with many E-V22* lineages) in Cruciani et al.'s original (2004) "delta cluster", which he had defined using Y-STR profiles. With the discovery of the defining SNP,  reported that V12* was found in its highest concentrations in Egypt, especially Southern Egypt.  report a significant presence of E-V12* in neighboring Sudan, including 5/33 Copts and 5/39 Nubians. E-V12* made up approximately 20% of the Sudanese E-M78. They propose that the E-V12 and E-V22 sub-clades of E-M78 might have been brought to Sudan from their place of origin in North Africa after the progressive desertification of the Sahara around 6,000–8,000 years ago. Sudden climate change might have forced several Neolithic cultures/people to migrate northward to the Mediterranean and southward to the Sahel and the Nile Valley. The E-V12* paragroup is also observed in Europe (e.g. amongst French Basques) and Eastern Anatolia (e.g. Erzurum Turks).

The non-basal subhaplogroup E1b1b-V12/E3b1a1 has been found at highest frequencies among various Afroasiatic-speaking populations in eastern Africa, including Garreh (74.1%), Gabra (58.6%), Wata (55.6%), Borana (50.0%), Sanye (41.7%), Beja (33.3%) and Rendille (29.0%).

Sub-clades of E-V12

E-M224

E-M224 has been found in Israel among Yemeni population (5%) and appears to be a minor subclade.

E-V32
 suggest that this sub-clade of E-V12, which originated in North Africa, and then subsequently expanded further south into the Horn of Africa, where it is now prevalent.  Before the discovery of V32,  referred to the same lineages as the "gamma cluster", which was estimated to have arisen about 8,500 years ago. They stated that "the highest frequencies in the three Cushitic-speaking groups: the Borana from Kenya (71.4%), the Oromo from Ethiopia (32.0%), and the Somali (52.2%). Outside of eastern Africa, it was found only in two subjects from Egypt (3.6%) and in one Arab from Morocco".  found it extremely prominent in Somali men and stated that "the male Somali population is a branch of the Horn African population – closely related to the Oromos in Ethiopia and North Kenya (Boranas)" and that their gamma cluster lineages "probably were introduced into the Somali population 4000–5000 years ago". More recently,  typed 147 males from Somalia for 12 Y-STR loci, and observed that 77% (113/147) had typical E-V32 haplotypes. This is currently the highest frequency of E-V32 found in any single sample population. Similarly,  in their study observed this to be the most common of the sub-clades of E-M78 found in Sudan, especially among the Beja, Masalit and Fur. The Beja, like Somalis and Oromos, speak an Afro-Asiatic language and live along the "corridor" from the Horn of Africa to Egypt.  interpret this as reinforcing the "strong correlation between linguistic and genetic diversity" and signs of relatedness between the Beja and the peoples of the Horn of Africa such as the Amhara, Oromo, and Somalis. On the other hand, the Masalit and Fur live in Darfur and speak a Nilo-Saharan language. The authors observed in their study that "the Masalit possesses by far the highest frequency of the E-M78 and of the E-V32 haplogroup", which they believe suggests "either a recent bottleneck in the population or a proximity to the origin of the haplogroup." However, More recently,  typed 147 males from Somalia for 12 Y-STR loci, and observed that 77% (113/147) had typical E-V32 haplotypes. This is the highest frequency of E-V32 found in any single sample population.

The STR data from  concerning E-V12 can be summarized as follows.

Sub-clades 
 E-V12
 E-FGC51357
 E-Y2863
 E-FGC14377
 E-FGC14378
 E-V32 
 E-Y25511
 E-Y15945
 E-Z813
 E-Z21175
 E-Y17859
 E-Y28701
 E-V5933
 E-Y17750
 E-CTS693
 E-SK872
 E-Y6730
 E-Y125054 
 E-FGC7703

Notes

References

Sources

E3b